In Greek mythology, Ptolemy or Ptolomeus (Ancient Greek: Πτολεμαῖος) was an ancestral ruler of Thebes, in ancient Greece living in the 12th century BCE. His father was Damasichthon; his son, Xanthus. Since the Homeric root to Ptolemy includes no "T", the name is reconstructed as Polemy.

Notes

References 

 Pausanias, Description of Greece with an English Translation by W.H.S. Jones, Litt.D., and H.A. Ormerod, M.A., in 4 Volumes. Cambridge, MA, Harvard University Press; London, William Heinemann Ltd. 1918. . Online version at the Perseus Digital Library
 Pausanias, Graeciae Descriptio. 3 vols. Leipzig, Teubner. 1903.  Greek text available at the Perseus Digital Library.

Theban kings
Kings in Greek mythology
Theban characters in Greek mythology